1143 Odysseus , provisional designation , is a large Jupiter trojan located in the Greek camp of Jupiter's orbit. It was discovered on 28 January 1930, by German astronomer Karl Reinmuth at the Heidelberg Observatory in southwest Germany, and later named after Odysseus, the legendary hero from Greek mythology. The dark D-type asteroid has a rotation period of 10.1 hours.

Orbit and classification 

Odysseus is a dark Jovian asteroid orbiting in the leading Greek camp at Jupiter's  Lagrangian point, 60° ahead of the Gas Giant's orbit in a 1:1 resonance (see Trojans in astronomy). It is a non-family asteroid in the Jovian background population.

It orbits the Sun at a distance of 4.8–5.7 AU once every 12 years (4,393 days; semi-major axis of 5.25 AU). Its orbit has an eccentricity of 0.09 and an inclination of 3° with respect to the ecliptic. As a Jupiter Trojan it is in a very stable orbit. Its closest approach to any major planet will be on 5 May 2083 when it will still be  from Mars. The body's observation arc begins at Heidelberg in February 1930, three weeks after its official discovery observation.

Naming 

This minor planet was named after the ancient Greek hero Odysseus (Odysseus Laertiades) in Homer's epic poem Odyssey. The official naming citation was mentioned in The Names of the Minor Planets by Paul Herget in 1955. Another Jupiter trojan, 5254 Ulysses, is named after the Latin variant of Odysseus.

Physical characteristics 

Odysseus is a dark D-type asteroid in both the Tholen classification and Bus–DeMeo classification.

Diameter and albedo 

According to the surveys carried out by the Infrared Astronomical Satellite IRAS, the Japanese Akari satellite and the NEOWISE mission of NASA's Wide-field Infrared Survey Explorer (WISE), Odysseus measures between 114.62 and 130.81 kilometers in diameter and its surface has an albedo between 0.050 and 0.0753.

The Collaborative Asteroid Lightcurve Link adopts the results obtained by IRAS, that is, an albedo of 0.0753 and a diameter of 125.64 kilometers based on an absolute magnitude of 7.93.

An estimated mean-diameter of 130, 125 and 114 kilometers measured by Akari, IRAS and WISE, makes Odysseus the 7th, 8th or 10th largest Jupiter Trojan, respectively.

Rotation period 

A large number of rotational lightcurves of Odysseus have been obtained since its first photometric observation by Richard Binzel in January 1988. In June 1994, the first accurate measurement of the asteroid's rotation period was made by Stefano Mottola using the former Bochum 0.61-metre Telescope at ESO's La Silla Observatory in northern Chile.

As of 2018, analysis of the best-rated lightcurve from observations by the Kepler space observatory during its K2 mission observing Campaign Field 6 in September 2015, gave a well-defined period of 10.114 hours with a brightness amplitude of 0.20 magnitude.

Notes

References

External links 
 Asteroid Lightcurve Database (LCDB), query form (info )
 Dictionary of Minor Planet Names, Google books
 Discovery Circumstances: Numbered Minor Planets (1)-(5000) – Minor Planet Center
 
 

001143
001143
Discoveries by Karl Wilhelm Reinmuth
Named minor planets
001143
19300128